The 2020–21 season was Dunfermline Athletic's fifth season in the Scottish Championship, having finished 6th in the 2019–20 season.

Squad list

Results & fixtures

Pre-season

Scottish Championship

Scottish Premiership Play–Off

Scottish League Cup

Group stage

Table

Knockout round

Scottish Cup

Squad statistics

Appearances and goals
During the 2020–21 season, Dunfermline used twenty-six different players in competitive matches. The table below shows the number of appearances and goals scored by each player. Forward Declan McManus made the most appearances, playing thirty-six out of a possible 36 games. Kevin O'Hara scored the most goals, with eleven in all competitions.

|-
|colspan="14"|Players away from the club on loan:

|-
|colspan="14"|Players who left during the season:

|}

Goalscorers
During the 2020–21 season, twelve Dunfermline players scored 51 goals in all competitions.

Disciplinary record

Club statistics

League table

Results by round

Results Summary

Awards

End of Season

Club

Transfers

First team

Players in

Players out

Loans in

Loans out

Reserve team

Players out

Contract extensions

Notes

References

Dunfermline Athletic F.C. seasons
Dunfermline Athletic